The compression set (ASTM D395) of a material is the permanent deformation remaining after removal of  a force that was applied to it. The term is normally applied to soft materials such as elastomers. Compression is normally measured in two ways: compression set A and compression set B.

Compression Set A

This has the formal name compression set under constant force in air. In compression set A a force of 1.8 kN is applied to the specimen for a set time at a set temperature. Compression set A is defined as the percentage of original specimen thickness after the specimen has been left in normal (uncompressed) conditions for 30 minutes.  CA, the compression set A is given by CA = [(to - ti) / to] * 100 
where to is the original specimen thickness and ti is the specimen thickness after testing.

Compression Set B

This has the formal name compression set under constant deflection in air. The specimen is compressed to 75% of its original height for a set time and at a set temperature (sample is compressed to .75 of its original height) Compression set B is (like Compression set A) defined as the percentage of original specimen thickness after it has been left in normal (uncompressed) conditions for 30 minutes.  CB, the compression set B is given by CB = [(to - ti) / (to - tn)] * 100 
where to is the original specimen thickness, ti is the specimen thickness after testing and tn is the spacer thickness or the specimen thickness during the test.

References

Deformation (mechanics)